Jeeto Pakistan League (season 1) is the first season of Jeeto Pakistan League , a "league"-based format of Jeeto Pakistan Presented by Fahad Mustafa, it started airing from Ramadan 2020 on ARY Digital.

Teams
The show consists of five teams competing for grand prize.

Notes:
 C = Champions; 
 R = Runner-up;
 (x) = Position at the end of the league;

Matches

References 

Pakistani television seasons